The 1935 LFF Lyga was the 14th season of the LFF Lyga football competition in Lithuania.  Kovas Kaunas won the championship.

Kaunas Group

Kaunas Group Final
Kovas Kaunas 2-1 MSK Kaunas

Klaipėda Group

Šiauliai Group

Panevėžys Group

Sūduva Group
Orija Kalvarija 2-1 Sveikata Kybartai

Ukmergė Group
Šaulys Ukmergė 4-0 Sparta Ukmergė

Žemaitija Group
Džiugas Telšiai 3-1 Šaulys Seda

Eighth final
Sakalas Šiauliai 3-1 Džiugas Telšiai

Quarterfinal
Šaulys Ukmergė 5-0 Orija Kalvarija
Sakalas Šiauliai - Šaulys Panevėžys

Semifinal
Kovas Kaunas 6-2 Šaulys Ukmergė
KSS Klaipėda 7-0 Sakalas Šiauliai

Final
Kovas Kaunas 3-2 KSS Klaipėda

References
RSSSF

LFF Lyga seasons
Lith
Lith
1